The COVID-19 pandemic, also known as the coronavirus pandemic, is an ongoing global pandemic of coronavirus disease 2019 (COVID-19) caused by severe acute respiratory syndrome coronavirus 2 (SARS-CoV-2). The novel virus was first identified in an outbreak in the Chinese city of Wuhan in December 2019. Attempts to contain it there failed, allowing the virus to spread to other areas of Asia and later worldwide. The World Health Organization (WHO) declared the outbreak a public health emergency of international concern on 30 January 2020, and a pandemic on 11 March 2020.

COVID-19 symptoms range from undetectable to deadly, but most commonly include fever, dry cough, and fatigue. Severe illness is more likely in elderly patients and those with certain underlying medical conditions. COVID-19 transmits when people breathe in air contaminated by droplets and small airborne particles containing the virus. The risk of breathing these in is highest when people are in close proximity, but they can be inhaled over longer distances, particularly indoors. Transmission can also occur if contaminated fluids reach the eyes, nose, or mouth, or, more rarely, through contaminated surfaces. Infected individuals are typically contagious for 10 days and can spread the virus even if they do not develop symptoms. Mutations have produced many strains (variants) with varying degrees of infectivity and virulence.

The COVID-19 vaccines have been approved and widely distributed in various countries since December 2020. According to a June 2022 study, COVID-19 vaccines prevented an additional 14.4 million to 19.8 million deaths in 185 countries and territories from 8 December 2020, to 8 December 2021. Other recommended preventive measures include social distancing, wearing masks, improving ventilation and air filtration, and quarantining those who have been exposed or are infected. Treatments include novel antiviral drugs and symptom control. Public health mitigation measures include travel restrictions, lockdowns, business restrictions and closures, workplace hazard controls, quarantines, testing systems, and contact tracing of the infected, which, together with treatments, serve to bring about the control and eventual end of the pandemic.

The pandemic has triggered severe social and economic disruption around the world, including the largest global recession since the Great Depression. Widespread supply shortages, including food shortages, were caused by supply chain disruptions. Reduced human activity led to an unprecedented decrease in pollution. Educational institutions and public areas were partially or fully closed in many jurisdictions, and many events were cancelled or postponed during 2020 and 2021. Misinformation has circulated through social media and mass media, and political tensions have intensified. The pandemic has raised issues of racial and geographic discrimination, health equity, and the balance between public health imperatives and individual rights.

While the WHO still considers the pandemic active, some countries are transitioning their public health approach towards regarding SARS-CoV-2 as an endemic virus.

Etymology 

The pandemic is known by several names. It is sometimes referred to as the "coronavirus pandemic" despite the existence of other human coronaviruses that have caused epidemics and outbreaks (e.g. SARS).

During the initial outbreak in Wuhan, the virus and disease were commonly referred to as "coronavirus", "Wuhan coronavirus", "the coronavirus outbreak" and the "Wuhan coronavirus outbreak", with the disease sometimes called "Wuhan pneumonia". In January 2020, the WHO recommended 2019-nCoV and 2019-nCoV acute respiratory disease as interim names for the virus and disease per 2015 international guidelines against using geographical locations (e.g. Wuhan, China), animal species, or groups of people in disease and virus names in part to prevent social stigma. WHO finalized the official names COVID-19 and SARS-CoV-2 on 11 February 2020. Tedros Adhanom Ghebreyesus explained: COfor corona, VIfor virus, Dfor disease and 19 for when the outbreak was first identified (31 December 2019). WHO additionally uses "the COVID-19 virus" and "the virus responsible for COVID-19" in public communications.

WHO names variants of concern and variants of interest using Greek letters. The initial practice of naming them according to where the variants were identified (e.g. Delta began as the "Indian variant") is no longer common. A more systematic naming scheme reflects the variant's PANGO lineage (e.g., Omicron's lineage is B.1.1.529) and is used for other variants.

Epidemiology

Background 

SARS-CoV-2 is a virus closely related to bat coronaviruses, pangolin coronaviruses, and SARS-CoV. The first known outbreak (the 2019-2020 COVID-19 outbreak in mainland China) started in Wuhan, Hubei, China, in November 2019. Many early cases were linked to people who had visited the Huanan Seafood Wholesale Market there, but it is possible that human-to-human transmission began earlier.

The scientific consensus is that the virus is most likely of a zoonotic origin, from bats or another closely-related mammal. Controversies about the origins of the virus heightened geopolitical divisions, notably between the United States and China.

The earliest known infected person fell ill on 1December 2019. That individual did not have a connection with the later wet market cluster. However, an earlier case may have occurred on 17 November. Two-thirds of the initial case cluster were linked with the market. Molecular clock analysis suggests that the index case is likely to have been infected between mid-October and mid-November 2019.

Cases 

Official "case" counts refer to the number of people who have been tested for COVID-19 and whose test has been confirmed positive according to official protocols whether or not they experienced symptomatic disease. Due to the effect of sampling bias, studies which obtain a more accurate number by extrapolating from a random sample have consistently found that total infections considerably exceed the reported case counts. Many countries, early on, had official policies to not test those with only mild symptoms. The strongest risk factors for severe illness are obesity, complications of diabetes, anxiety disorders, and the total number of conditions.

In early 2020, a meta-analysis of self-reported cases in China by age indicated that a relatively low proportion of cases occurred in individuals under 20. It was not clear whether this was because young people were less likely to be infected, or less likely to develop symptoms and be tested. A retrospective cohort study in China found that children and adults were just as likely to be infected.

Among more thorough studies, preliminary results from 9 April 2020, found that in Gangelt, the centre of a major infection cluster in Germany, 15 per cent of a population sample tested positive for antibodies. Screening for COVID-19 in pregnant women in New York City, and blood donors in the Netherlands, found rates of positive antibody tests that indicated more infections than reported. Seroprevalence-based estimates are conservative as some studies show that persons with mild symptoms do not have detectable antibodies.

Initial estimates of the basic reproduction number (R0) for COVID-19 in January 2020 were between 1.4 and 2.5, but a subsequent analysis claimed that it may be about 5.7 (with a 95 per cent confidence interval of 3.8 to 8.9).

In December 2021, the number of cases continued to climb due to several factors, including new COVID-19 variants. As of that 28December, 282,790,822 individuals worldwide had been confirmed as infected. , over 500 million cases were confirmed globally. Most cases are unconfirmed, with the Institute for Health Metrics and Evaluation estimating the true number of cases as of early 2022 to be in the billions.

Deaths 

The first confirmed death was in Wuhan on 9 January 2020. These numbers vary by region and over time, influenced by testing volume, healthcare system quality, treatment options, government response, time since the initial outbreak, and population characteristics, such as age, sex, and overall health.

Multiple measures are used to quantify mortality. Official death counts typically include people who died after testing positive. Such counts exclude deaths without a test. Conversely, deaths of people who died from underlying conditions following a positive test may be included. Countries such as Belgium include deaths from suspected cases, including those without a test, thereby increasing counts.

Official death counts have been claimed to underreport the actual death toll, because excess mortality (the number of deaths in a period compared to a long-term average) data show an increase in deaths that is not explained by COVID-19 deaths alone. Using such data, estimates of the true number of deaths from COVID-19 worldwide have included a range from 16.5 to 26.8 million (≈20.2 million) by 3 February 2023 by The Economist, as well as over 18.5 million by 1 April 2023 by the Institute for Health Metrics and Evaluation and ≈18.2 million (earlier) deaths between 1 January 2020, and 31 December 2021, by a comprehensive international study. Such deaths include deaths due to healthcare capacity constraints and priorities, as well as reluctance to seek care (to avoid possible infection). Further research may help distinguish the proportions directly caused by COVID-19 from those caused by indirect consequences of the pandemic.

In May 2022, the WHO estimated the number of excess deaths by the end of 2021 to be 14.9 million compared to 5.4 million reported COVID-19 deaths, with the majority of the unreported 9.5 million deaths believed to be direct deaths due the virus, rather than indirect deaths. Some deaths were because people with other conditions could not access medical services.

A December 2022 WHO study estimated excess deaths from the pandemic during 2020 and 2021, again concluding ≈14.8 million excess early deaths occurred, reaffirming and detailing their prior calculations from May as well as updating them, addressing criticisms. These numbers do not include measures like years of potential life lost and may make the pandemic 2021's leading cause of death.

The time between symptom onset and death ranges from6 to 41 days, typically about 14 days. Mortality rates increase as a function of age. People at the greatest mortality risk are the elderly and those with underlying conditions.

Infection fatality ratio (IFR) 

The infection fatality ratio (IFR) is the cumulative number of deaths attributed to the disease divided by the cumulative number of infected individuals (including asymptomatic and undiagnosed infections and excluding vaccinated infected individuals). It is expressed in percentage points (not as a decimal). Other studies refer to this metric as the 'infection fatality risk'.

In November 2020, a review article in Nature reported estimates of population-weighted IFRs for various countries, excluding deaths in elderly care facilities, and found a median range of 0.24% to 1.49%.

IFRs rise as a function of age (from 0.002% at age 10 and 0.01% at age 25, to 0.4% at age 55, 1.4% at age 65, 4.6% at age 75, and 15% at age 85). These rates vary by a factor of ≈10,000 across the age groups. For comparison, the IFR for middle-aged adults is two orders of magnitude higher than the annualised risk of a fatal automobile accident and much higher than the risk of dying from seasonal influenza.

In December 2020, a systematic review and meta-analysis estimated that population-weighted IFR was 0.5% to 1% in some countries (France, Netherlands, New Zealand, and Portugal), 1% to 2% in other countries (Australia, England, Lithuania, and Spain), and about 2.5% in Italy. This study reported that most of the differences reflected corresponding differences in the population's age structure and the age-specific pattern of infections.

Case fatality ratio (CFR) 
Another metric in assessing death rate is the case fatality ratio (CFR), which is the ratio of deaths to diagnoses. This metric can be misleading because of the delay between symptom onset and death and because testing focuses on symptomatic individuals.

The number varies by region and has generally declined over time.

Disease

Variants 

Several variants have been named by WHO and labelled as a variant of concern (VoC) or a variant of interest (VoI). They share the more infectious D614G mutation: Delta dominated and then eliminated earlier VoC from most jurisdictions. Omicron's immune escape ability may allow it to spread via breakthrough infections, which in turn may allow it to coexist with Delta, which more often infects the unvaccinated.

Signs and symptoms 

Symptoms of COVID-19 are variable, ranging from mild symptoms to severe illness. Common symptoms include headache, loss of smell and taste, nasal congestion and runny nose, cough, muscle pain, sore throat, fever, diarrhoea, and breathing difficulties. People with the same infection may have different symptoms, and their symptoms may change over time. Three common clusters of symptoms have been identified: one respiratory symptom cluster with cough, sputum, shortness of breath, and fever; a musculoskeletal symptom cluster with muscle and joint pain, headache, and fatigue; a cluster of digestive symptoms with abdominal pain, vomiting, and diarrhoea. In people without prior ear, nose, and throat disorders, loss of taste combined with loss of smell is associated with COVID-19 and is reported in as many as 88% of cases.

Transmission 

The disease is mainly transmitted via the respiratory route when people inhale droplets and small airborne particles (that form an aerosol) that infected people exhale as they breathe, talk, cough, sneeze, or sing. Infected people are more likely to transmit COVID-19 when they are physically close. However, infection can occur over longer distances, particularly indoors.

Cause 

SARS‑CoV‑2 belongs to the broad family of viruses known as coronaviruses. It is a positive-sense single-stranded RNA (+ssRNA) virus, with a single linear RNA segment. Coronaviruses infect humans, other mammals, including livestock and companion animals, and avian species.

Human coronaviruses are capable of causing illnesses ranging from the common cold to more severe diseases such as Middle East respiratory syndrome (MERS, fatality rate ≈34%). SARS-CoV-2 is the seventh known coronavirus to infect people, after 229E, NL63, OC43, HKU1, MERS-CoV, and the original SARS-CoV.

Diagnosis 

The standard methods of testing for presence of SARS-CoV-2 are nucleic acid tests, which detects the presence of viral RNA fragments. As these tests detect RNA but not infectious virus, its "ability to determine duration of infectivity of patients is limited." The test is typically done on respiratory samples obtained by a nasopharyngeal swab; however, a nasal swab or sputum sample may also be used. The WHO has published several testing protocols for the disease.

Prevention 

Preventive measures to reduce the chances of infection include getting vaccinated, staying at home or spending more time outdoors, avoiding crowded places, keeping distance from others, wearing a mask in public, ventilating indoor spaces, managing potential exposure durations, washing hands with soap and water often and for at least twenty seconds, practicing good respiratory hygiene, and avoiding touching the eyes, nose, or mouth with unwashed hands.

Those diagnosed with COVID-19 or who believe they may be infected are advised by the CDC to stay home except to get medical care, call ahead before visiting a healthcare provider, wear a face mask before entering the healthcare provider's office and when in any room or vehicle with another person, cover coughs and sneezes with a tissue, regularly wash hands with soap and water and avoid sharing personal household items.

Vaccines

A COVID-19 vaccine is intended to provide acquired immunity against severe acute respiratory syndrome coronavirus 2 (SARS‑CoV‑2), the virus that causes coronavirus disease 2019 (COVID-19). Prior to the COVID-19 pandemic, an established body of knowledge existed about the structure and function of coronaviruses causing diseases like severe acute respiratory syndrome (SARS) and Middle East respiratory syndrome (MERS). This knowledge accelerated the development of various vaccine platforms during early 2020. The initial focus of SARS-CoV-2 vaccines was on preventing symptomatic, often severe illness. On 10 January 2020, the SARS-CoV-2 genetic sequence data was shared through GISAID, and by 19 March, the global pharmaceutical industry announced a major commitment to address COVID-19. The COVID-19 vaccines are widely credited for their role in reducing the severity and death caused by COVID-19.

As of late-December 2021, more than 4.49 billion people had received one or more doses (8+ billion in total) in over 197 countries. The Oxford-AstraZeneca vaccine was the most widely used.

On 8 November 2022, Novavax's COVID-19 vaccine booster was authorized for use in adults in the United Kingdom. On 12 November 2022, the WHO released its Global Vaccine Market Report. The report indicated that "inequitable distribution is not unique to COVID-19 vaccines"; countries that are not economically strong struggle to obtain vaccines.

On 14 November 2022, the first inhalable vaccine was introduced, developed by Chinese biopharmaceutical company CanSino Biologics, in the city of Shanghai, China.

Treatment 

For the first two years of the pandemic, no specific and effective treatment or cure was available. In 2021, the European Medicines Agency's (EMA) Committee for Medicinal Products for Human Use (CHMP) approved the oral antiviral protease inhibitor, Paxlovid (nirmatrelvir plus AIDS drug ritonavir), to treat adult patients. FDA later gave it an EUA.

Most cases of COVID-19 are mild. In these, supportive care includes medication such as paracetamol or NSAIDs to relieve symptoms (fever, body aches, cough), adequate intake of oral fluids and rest. Good personal hygiene and a healthy diet are also recommended.

Supportive care includes treatment to relieve symptoms, fluid therapy, oxygen support and prone positioning, and medications or devices to support other affected vital organs. More severe cases may need treatment in hospital. In those with low oxygen levels, use of the glucocorticoid dexamethasone is recommended, to reduce mortality. Noninvasive ventilation and, ultimately, admission to an intensive care unit for mechanical ventilation may be required to support breathing. Extracorporeal membrane oxygenation (ECMO) has been used to address the issue of respiratory failure.

Existing drugs such as hydroxychloroquine, lopinavir/ritonavir, ivermectin and so-called early treatment are not recommended by US or European health authorities, as there is no good evidence they have any useful effect. The antiviral remdesivir is available in the US, Canada, Australia, and several other countries, with varying restrictions; however, it is not recommended for use with mechanical ventilation, and is discouraged altogether by the World Health Organization (WHO), due to limited evidence of its efficacy.

Prognosis 

The severity of COVID-19 varies. The disease may take a mild course with few or no symptoms, resembling other common upper respiratory diseases such as the common cold. In 3–4% of cases (7.4% for those over age 65) symptoms are severe enough to cause hospitalization. Mild cases typically recover within two weeks, while those with severe or critical diseases may take three to six weeks to recover. Among those who have died, the time from symptom onset to death has ranged from two to eight weeks. Prolonged prothrombin time and elevated C-reactive protein levels on admission to the hospital are associated with severe course of COVID-19 and with a transfer to intensive care units (ICU).

Between 5% and 50% of COVID-19 patients experience long COVID, a condition characterized by long-term consequences persisting after the typical convalescence period of the disease. The most commonly reported clinical presentations are fatigue and memory problems, as well as malaise, headaches, shortness of breath, loss of smell, muscle weakness, low fever and cognitive dysfunction.

Strategies 

Many countries attempted to slow or stop the spread of COVID-19 by recommending, mandating or prohibiting behaviour changes, while others relied primarily on providing information. Measures ranged from public advisories to stringent lockdowns. Outbreak control strategies are divided into elimination and mitigation. Experts differentiate between elimination strategies (known as "zero-COVID") that aim to completely stop the spread of the virus within the community, and mitigation strategies (commonly known as "flattening the curve") that attempt to lessen the effects of the virus on society, but which still tolerate some level of transmission within the community. These initial strategies can be pursued sequentially or simultaneously during the acquired immunity phase through natural and vaccine-induced immunity.

Nature reported in 2021 that 90 per cent of immunologists who responded to a survey "think that the coronavirus will become endemic".

Containment 

Containment is undertaken to stop an outbreak from spreading into the general population. Infected individuals are isolated while they are infectious. The people they have interacted with are contacted and isolated for long enough to ensure that they are either not infected or no longer contagious. Screening is the starting point for containment. Screening is done by checking for symptoms to identify infected individuals, who can then be isolated or offered treatment. The Zero-COVID strategy involves using public health measures such as contact tracing, mass testing, border quarantine, lockdowns and mitigation software to stop community transmission of COVID-19 as soon as it is detected, with the goal of getting the area back to zero detected infections and resuming normal economic and social activities. Successful containment or suppression reduces Rt to less than 1.

Mitigation 

Should containment fail, efforts focus on mitigation: measures taken to slow the spread and limit its effects on the healthcare system and society.
Successful mitigation delays and decreases the epidemic peak, known as "flattening the epidemic curve". This decreases the risk of overwhelming health services and provides more time for developing vaccines and treatments. Individual behaviour changed in many jurisdictions. Many people worked from home instead of at their traditional workplaces.

Non-pharmaceutical interventions 

Non-pharmaceutical interventions that may reduce spread include personal actions such as wearing face masks, self-quarantine, and hand hygiene; community measures aimed at reducing interpersonal contacts such as closing workplaces and schools and cancelling large gatherings; community engagement to encourage acceptance and participation in such interventions; as well as environmental measures such as surface cleaning.

Other measures 
More drastic actions, such as quarantining entire populations and strict travel bans have been attempted in various jurisdictions. China and Australia's lockdowns have been the most strict. New Zealand implemented the most severe travel restrictions. South Korea introduced mass screening and localised quarantines, and issued alerts on the movements of infected individuals. Singapore provided financial support, quarantined, and imposed large fines for those who broke quarantine.

Contact tracing 

Contact tracing attempts to identify recent contacts of newly infected individuals, and to screen them for infection; the traditional approach is to request a list of contacts from infectees, and then telephone or visit the contacts. Contact tracing was widely used during the Western African Ebola virus epidemic in 2014.

Another approach is to collect location data from mobile devices to identify those who have come in significant contact with infectees, which prompted privacy concerns. On 10 April 2020, Google and Apple announced an initiative for privacy-preserving contact tracing. In Europe and in the US, Palantir Technologies initially provided COVID-19 tracking services.

Health care 

WHO described increasing capacity and adapting healthcare as a fundamental mitigation. The ECDC and WHO's European regional office issued guidelines for hospitals and primary healthcare services for shifting resources at multiple levels, including focusing laboratory services towards testing, cancelling elective procedures, separating and isolating patients, and increasing intensive care capabilities by training personnel and increasing ventilators and beds. The pandemic drove widespread adoption of telehealth.

Improvised manufacturing 

Due to capacity supply chains limitations, some manufacturers began 3D printing material such as nasal swabs and ventilator parts. In one example, an Italian startup received legal threats due to alleged patent infringement after reverse-engineering and printing one hundred requested ventilator valves overnight. Individuals and groups of makers created and shared open source designs, and manufacturing devices using locally sourced materials, sewing, and 3D printing. Millions of face shields, protective gowns, and masks were made. Other ad hoc medical supplies included shoe covers, surgical caps, powered air-purifying respirators, and hand sanitizer. Novel devices were created such as ear savers, non-invasive ventilation helmets, and ventilator splitters.

Herd immunity 
In July 2021, several experts expressed concern that achieving herd immunity may not be possible because Delta can transmit among vaccinated individuals. CDC published data showing that vaccinated people could transmit Delta, something officials believed was less likely with other variants. Consequently, WHO and CDC encouraged vaccinated people to continue with non-pharmaceutical interventions such as masking, social distancing, and quarantining if exposed.

History

2019 

The outbreak was discovered in Wuhan in November 2019. It is possible that human-to-human transmission was happening before the discovery. Based on a retrospective analysis starting from December 2019, the number of cases in Hubei gradually increased, reaching 60 by 20 December and at least 266 by 31 December.

A pneumonia cluster was observed on 26 December and treated by Doctor Zhang Jixian. She informed the Wuhan Jianghan CDC on 27 December. Vision Medicals reported the discovery of a novel coronavirus to the China CDC (CCDC) on 28 December.

On 30 December, a test report from CapitalBio Medlab addressed to Wuhan Central Hospital reported an erroneous positive result for SARS, causing doctors there to alert authorities. Eight of those doctors, including Li Wenliang (who was also punished on 3January), were later admonished by the police for spreading false rumours; and Ai Fen was reprimanded. That evening, Wuhan Municipal Health Commission (WMHC) issued a notice about "the treatment of pneumonia of unknown cause". The next day, WMHC made the announcement public, confirming 27 cases—enough to trigger an investigation.

On 31 December, the WHO office in China was informed of cases of the pneumonia cases and immediately launched an investigation.

Official Chinese sources claimed that the early cases were mostly linked to the Huanan Seafood Wholesale Market, which also sold live animals. However, in May 2020, CCDC director George Gao indicated the market was not the origin (animal samples had tested negative).

2020 

On 11 January, WHO was notified by the Chinese National Health Commission that the outbreak was associated with exposures in the market, and that China had identified a new type of coronavirus, which it isolated on 7 January.

Initially, the number of cases doubled approximately every seven and a half days. In early and mid-January, the virus spread to other Chinese provinces, helped by the Chinese New Year migration. Wuhan was a transport hub and major rail interchange. On 10 January, the virus's genome was shared through GISAID. A retrospective study published in March found that 6,174 people had reported symptoms by 20 January. A 24 January report indicated human transmission, recommended personal protective equipment for health workers, and advocated testing, given the outbreak's "pandemic potential". On 31 January the first published modelling study warned of inevitable "independent self-sustaining outbreaks in major cities globally" and called for "large-scale public health interventions."

On 30 January, 7,818 infections had been confirmed, leading WHO to declare the outbreak a Public Health Emergency of International Concern (PHEIC). On 11 March, WHO elevated it to a pandemic.

By 31 January, Italy had its first confirmed infections, in two tourists from China. On 19 March, Italy overtook China as the country with the most reported deaths. By 26 March, the United States had overtaken China and Italy as the country with the highest number of confirmed infections. Genomic analysis indicated that the majority of New York's confirmed infections came from Europe, rather than directly from Asia. Testing of prior samples revealed a person who was infected in France on 27 December 2019 and a person in the United States who died from the disease on 6February.

In October, WHO reported that one in ten people around the world may have been infected, or 780 million people, while only 35 million infections had been confirmed.

On 9 November, Pfizer released trial results for a candidate vaccine, showing a 90 per cent effectiveness against infection. That day, Novavax entered an FDA Fast Track application for their vaccine.

On 14 December, Public Health England reported that a variant had been discovered in the UK's southeast, predominantly in Kent. The variant, later named Alpha, showed changes to the spike protein that could be more infectious. As of 13 December, 1,108 infections had been confirmed.

On 4 February 2020, US Secretary of Health and Human Services Alex Azar waived liability for vaccine manufacturers.

2021 

On 2 January, the Alpha variant, first discovered in the UK, had been identified in 33 countries. On 6 January, the Gamma variant was first identified in Japanese travellers returning from Brazil. On 29 January, it was reported that the Novavax vaccine was 49 per cent effective against the Beta variant in a clinical trial in South Africa. The CoronaVac vaccine was reported to be 50.4 per cent effective in a Brazil clinical trial.

On 12 March, several countries stopped using the Oxford-AstraZeneca COVID-19 vaccine due to blood clotting problems, specifically cerebral venous sinus thrombosis (CVST). On 20 March, the WHO and European Medicines Agency found no link to thrombus, leading several countries to resume the vaccine. In March WHO reported that an animal host was the most likely origin, without ruling out other possibilities. The Delta variant was first identified in India. In mid-April, the variant was first detected in the UK and two months later it had metastasized into a third wave there, forcing the government to delay reopening that was originally scheduled for June.

On 10 November, Germany advised against the Moderna vaccine for people under 30. On 24 November, the Omicron variant was detected in South Africa; a few days later the World Health Organization declared it a VoC (variant of concern). The new variant is more infectious than the Delta variant.

2022

On 1 January, Europe passed 100 million cases amidst a surge in the Omicron variant. Later that month on 14 January, the World Health Organization recommended two new treatments, Baricitinib, and Sotrovimab (although conditionally). Later on 24 January, it was reported that about 57% of the world had been infected by COVID-19, per the Institute for Health Metrics and Evaluation Model.

On 6 March, it was reported that the total worldwide death count had surpassed 6 million people since the start of the pandemic. Some time later, on 6 July, it was reported that Omicron subvariants BA.4 and BA.5 had spread worldwide.

On 21 October the United States surpassed 99 million cases of COVID-19, the most cases of any country.

On 30 October, it was reported that worldwide 424 deaths occurred due to the virus, the lowest since 385 deaths were reported on 12 March 2020. 17 November marked the three-year anniversary since health officials in China first detected COVID-19.
Ghebreyesus of the WHO stated on 14 September 2022, that "[The world has] never been in a better position to end the pandemic", citing the lowest number of weekly reported deaths since March 2020.  He continued, "We are not there yet.  But the end is in sight—we can see the finish line".

On 11 November, the World Health Organization reported that deaths since the month of February have dropped 90 percent.  Director-General Tedros Adhanom Ghebreyesus said this was "cause for optimism". On 3 December, the World Health Organization indicated that, "at least 90% of the world's population has some level of immunity to Sars-CoV-2". On 21 December, data from China's health authorities revealed that 248 million people, nearly 18 percent of its population, had been infected within just the first 20 days of December, as China abruptly halted its stringent lockdown measures.

On 29 December 2022, the U.S. joined Italy, Japan, Taiwan and India in requiring negative COVID-19 test results from all people traveling from China due to the new surge in cases, while the EU refused similar measures, stating that the BF7 omicron variant had already spread throughout Europe without becoming dominant.

2023

On 4 January 2023, the World Health Organization indicated that the information being shared by China during its latest virus surge lacks data, such as hospitalization rates. On 10 January, the World Health Organization’s Europe office indicated that there was no current threat from China's recent viral surge for the aforementioned region. On January 16, the WHO recommended, "the monitoring of excess mortality, which provides us with a more comprehensive understanding of the impact of COVID-19", in regards to the current surge in China.

On 27 January, the World Health Organization met to decide if COVID-19 still met the criteria of a public health emergency of international concern (PHEIC). Its decision was announced on 30 January, exactly 3 years to the day when it was first declared; it was decided it was still a PHEIC. On 8 February, it was reported that a recent study aimed at China's case surge indicated no new COVID-19 variants have emerged as a result.

On 19, March WHO director Dr. Tedros Adhanom Ghebreyesus indicated that he is "confident" the COVID-19 pandemic would come to an end this year.

National responses 

National reactions ranged from strict lockdowns to public education campaigns. WHO recommended that curfews and lockdowns should be short-term measures to reorganise, regroup, rebalance resources, and protect the health care system.
As of 26 March 2020, 1.7 billion people worldwide were under some form of lockdown. This increased to 3.9 billion people by the first week of April—more than half the world's population.

Asia 

As of the end of 2021, Asia's peak had come at the same time and at the same level as the world as a whole, in May 2021. However, cumulatively they had experienced only half the world average.

China opted for containment, inflicting strict lockdowns to eliminate spread.
The vaccines distributed in China included the BIBP, WIBP, and CoronaVac. It was reported on 11 December 2021, that China had vaccinated 1.162 billion of its citizens, or 82.5% of the total population of the country against COVID-19. China's large-scale adoption of zero-COVID had largely contained the first waves of infections of the disease. When the waves of infections due to the Omicron variant followed, China was almost alone in pursuing the strategy of zero-Covid to combat the spread of the virus in 2022. Lockdown continued to be employed in November to combat a new wave of cases; however, protests erupted in cities across China over the country's stringent measures, and in December that year, the country relaxed its zero-COVID policy. On 20 December 2022, the Chinese State Council narrowed its definition of what would be counted as a COVID-19 death to include solely respiratory failure, which led to skepticism by health experts of the government's total death count at a time when hospitals reported being overwhelmed with cases following the abrupt discontinuation of zero-COVID.

The first case in India was reported on 30 January 2020. India ordered a nationwide lockdown starting 24 March 2020, with a phased unlock beginning 1 June 2020. Six cities accounted for around half of reported cases—Mumbai, Delhi, Ahmedabad, Chennai, Pune and Kolkata. Post-lockdown, the Government of India introduced a contact tracking app called Arogya Setu to help authorities manage contact tracing. Later this app was also used for a vaccination management program. India's vaccination program was considered to be the world's largest and the most successful with over 90% of citizens getting the first dose and another 65% getting the second dose. A second wave hit India in April 2021, straining healthcare services. On 21 October 2021, it was reported that the country had surpassed 1 billion vaccinations.

Iran reported its first confirmed cases on 19 February 2020, in Qom. Early measures included the cancellation of concerts and other cultural events, Friday prayers, and education shutdowns. Iran became a centre of the pandemic in February 2020. More than ten countries had traced their outbreaks to Iran by 28 February, indicating a more severe outbreak than the 388 reported cases. The Iranian Parliament closed, after 23 of its 290 members tested positive on 3March 2020. At least twelve sitting or former Iranian politicians and government officials had died by 17 March 2020. By August 2021, the pandemic's fifth wave peaked, with more than 400 deaths in 1 day.

COVID-19 was confirmed in South Korea on 20 January 2020. Military bases were quarantined after tests showed three infected soldiers. South Korea introduced what was then considered the world's largest and best-organised screening programme, isolating infected people, and tracing and quarantining contacts. Screening methods included mandatory self-reporting by new international arrivals through mobile application, combined with drive-through testing, and increasing testing capability to 20,000 people/day. Despite some early criticisms, South Korea's programme was considered a success in controlling the outbreak without quarantining entire cities.

Europe 

The global COVID-19 pandemic arrived in Europe with its first confirmed case in Bordeaux, France, on 24 January 2020, and subsequently spread widely across the continent. By 17 March 2020, every country in Europe had confirmed a case, and all have reported at least one death, with the exception of Vatican City. Italy was the first European nation to experience a major outbreak in early 2020, becoming the first country worldwide to introduce a national lockdown. By 13 March 2020, the World Health Organization (WHO) declared Europe the epicentre of the pandemic and it remained so until the WHO announced it had been overtaken by South America on 22 May. By 18 March 2020, more than 250 million people were in lockdown in Europe. Despite deployment of COVID-19 vaccines, Europe became the pandemic's epicentre once again in late 2021.

The Italian outbreak began on 31 January 2020, when two Chinese tourists tested positive for SARS-CoV-2 in Rome. Cases began to rise sharply, which prompted the government to suspend flights to and from China and declare a state of emergency. On 22 February 2020, the Council of Ministers announced a new decree-law to contain the outbreak, including quarantining more than 50,000 people in northern Italy. On 4 March the Italian government ordered schools and universities closed as Italy reached a hundred deaths. Sport was suspended completely for at least one month. On 11 March Conte stopped nearly all commercial activity except supermarkets and pharmacies. On 19 March Italy overtook China as the country with the most COVID-19-related deaths. On 19 April the first wave ebbed, as 7-day deaths declined to 433. On 13 October, the Italian government again issued restrictive rules to contain the second wave. On 10 November Italy surpassed 1 million confirmed infections. On 23 November, it was reported that the second wave of the virus had led some hospitals to stop accepting patients.

The virus was first confirmed to have spread to Spain on 31 January 2020, when a German tourist tested positive for SARS-CoV-2 in La Gomera, Canary Islands. Post-hoc genetic analysis has shown that at least 15 strains of the virus had been imported, and community transmission began by mid-February. On 29 March, it was announced that, beginning the following day, all non-essential workers were ordered to remain at home for the next 14 days. The number of cases increased again in July in a number of cities including Barcelona, Zaragoza and Madrid, which led to reimposition of some restrictions but no national lockdown. By September 2021, Spain was one of the countries with the highest per centage of its population vaccinated (76% fully vaccinated and 79% with the first dose), while also being one of the countries more in favour of vaccines against COVID-19 (nearly 94% of its population were already vaccinated or wanted to be). However, as of 21 January 2022, this figure had only increased to 80.6%. Nevertheless, Spain leads Europe for per-capita full-vaccination rates. Italy is ranked second at 75%.

Sweden differed from most other European countries in that it mostly remained open. Per the Swedish Constitution, the Public Health Agency of Sweden has autonomy that prevents political interference and the agency favoured remaining open. The Swedish strategy focused on longer-term measures, based on the assumption that after lockdown the virus would resume spreading, with the same result. By the end of June, Sweden no longer had excess mortality.

Devolution in the United Kingdom meant that each of its four countries developed its own response. England's restrictions were shorter-lived than the others. The UK government started enforcing social distancing and quarantine measures on 18 March 2020. On 16 March, Prime Minister Boris Johnson advised against non-essential travel and social contact, praising work from home and avoiding venues such as pubs, restaurants, and theatres. On 20 March, the government ordered all leisure establishments to close, and promised to prevent unemployment. On 23 March, Johnson banned gatherings and restricted non-essential travel and outdoor activity. Unlike previous measures, these restrictions were enforceable by police through fines and dispersal of gatherings. Most non-essential businesses were ordered to close. On 24 April 2020, it was reported that a promising vaccine trial had begun in England; the government pledged more than £50 million towards research. On 16 April 2020, it was reported that the UK would have first access to the Oxford vaccine, due to a prior contract; should the trial be successful, some 30 million doses would be available. On 2 December 2020, the UK became the first developed country to approve the Pfizer vaccine; 800,000 doses were immediately available for use. In August 2022 it was reported that viral infection cases had declined in the UK.

North America 

The virus arrived in the United States on 13 January 2020. Cases were reported in all North American countries after Saint Kitts and Nevis confirmed a case on 25 March, and in all North American territories after Bonaire confirmed a case on 16 April.

 confirmed cases have been reported in the United States with  deaths, the most of any country, and the nineteenth-highest per capita worldwide. COVID-19 is the deadliest pandemic in U.S. history; it was the third-leading cause of death in the U.S. in 2020, behind heart disease and cancer. From 2019 to 2020, U.S. life expectancy dropped by 3years for Hispanic Americans, 2.9years for African Americans, and 1.2years for white Americans. These effects have persisted as U.S. deaths due to COVID-19 in 2021 exceeded those in 2020. In the United States, COVID-19 vaccines became available in December 2020, under emergency use, beginning the national vaccination program, with the first vaccine officially approved by the Food and Drug Administration on 23 August 2021. On 18 November 2022, while cases in the U.S. have declined, COVID variants BQ.1/BQ.1.1 have become dominant in the country.

In March 2020, as cases of community transmission were confirmed across Canada, all of its provinces and territories declared states of emergency. Provinces and territories have, to varying degrees, implemented school and daycare closures, prohibitions on gatherings, closures of non-essential businesses and restrictions on entry. Canada severely restricted its border access, barring travellers from all countries with some exceptions. Cases surged across Canada, notably in the provinces of British Columbia, Alberta, Quebec and Ontario, with the formation of the Atlantic Bubble, a travel-restricted area of the country (formed of the four Atlantic provinces). Vaccine passports were adopted in all provinces and two of the territories. Per a report on 11 November 2022, Canada is facing a surge in influenza, while COVID-19 is expected to rise during winter.

South America 

The COVID-19 pandemic was confirmed to have reached South America on 26 February 2020, when Brazil confirmed a case in São Paulo. By 3 April, all countries and territories in South America had recorded at least one case. On 13 May 2020, it was reported that Latin America and the Caribbean had reported over 400,000 cases of COVID-19 infection with 23,091 deaths. On 22 May 2020, citing the rapid increase of infections in Brazil, the World Health Organization WHO declared South America the epicentre of the pandemic. As of 16 July 2021, South America had recorded 34,359,631 confirmed cases and 1,047,229 deaths from COVID-19. Due to a shortage of testing and medical facilities, it is believed that the outbreak is far larger than the official numbers show.

The virus was confirmed to have spread to Brazil on 25 February 2020, when a man from São Paulo who had traveled to Italy tested positive for the virus. The disease had spread to every federative unit of Brazil by 21 March. On 19 June 2020, the country reported its one millionth case and nearly 49,000 reported deaths. One estimate of under-reporting was 22.62% of total reported COVID-19 mortality in 2020.

Africa 

The COVID-19 pandemic was confirmed to have spread to Africa on 14 February 2020, with the first confirmed case announced in Egypt. The first confirmed case in sub-Saharan Africa was announced in Nigeria at the end of February 2020. Within three months, the virus had spread throughout the continent, as Lesotho, the last African sovereign state to have remained free of the virus, reported a case on 13 May 2020. By 26 May, it appeared that most African countries were experiencing community transmission, although testing capacity was limited. Most of the identified imported cases arrived from Europe and the United States rather than from China where the virus originated. Many preventive measures have been implemented by different countries in Africa including travel restrictions, flight cancellations, and event cancellations.

In early June 2021, Africa faced a third wave of COVID infections with cases rising in 14 countries. By 4 July the continent recorded more than 251,000 new COVID cases, a 20% increase from the prior week and a 12% increase from the January peak. More than sixteen African countries, including Malawi and Senegal, recorded an uptick in new cases. The World Health Organization labelled it Africa's 'Worst Pandemic Week Ever'. In October 2022, it was reported by the World Health Organization that most countries on the African continent will miss the goal of 70 percent of their population being vaccinated by the end of 2022.

Oceania 

The COVID-19 pandemic was confirmed to have reached Oceania on 25 January 2020, with the first confirmed case reported in Melbourne, Australia. It has since spread elsewhere in the region. Australia and New Zealand were praised for their handling of the pandemic in comparison to other Western nations, with New Zealand and each state in Australia wiping out all community transmission of the virus several times even after re-introduction into the community.

As a result of the high transmissibility of the Delta variant, however, by August 2021, the Australian states of New South Wales and Victoria had conceded defeat in their eradication efforts. In early October 2021, New Zealand also abandoned its elimination strategy. In November and December, following vaccination efforts, the remaining states of Australia, excluding Western Australia, voluntarily gave up COVID-zero to open up state and international borders. The open borders allowed the Omicron Variant of COVID-19 to enter quickly and cases subsequently exceeded 120,000 a day. By early March, with cases exceeding 1000 a day Western Australia conceded defeat in its eradication strategy and opened the borders after previously delaying the re-opening due to the omicron variant. Despite record cases, Australian jurisdictions slowly removed restrictions such as close contact isolation, mask wearing and density limits by April.

On 9 September restrictions were significantly relaxed. The mask mandate on aircraft was scrapped nationwide. 9 September was also the last day cases were reported daily in Australia as the country transitioned to weekly reporting instead. On 14 September, COVID-19 disaster payment for people who had to isolate due to COVID-19 was extended so long as isolating was mandated by the government. By 22 September all states had ended mask mandates on public transport including in Victoria where the mandate had lasted some 800 days. On 30 September 2022, all Australian leaders declared the emergency response finished and announced the end of the requirement for people to isolate from 14 October if they have COVID-19 due in part to high levels of 'hybrid immunity' and very low case numbers.

Antarctica 

Due to its remoteness and sparse population, Antarctica was the last continent to have confirmed cases of COVID-19 and was one of the last regions of the world affected directly by the pandemic. The first cases were reported in December 2020, almost a year after the first cases of COVID-19 were detected in China. At least 36 people are confirmed to have been infected.

Other responses

United Nations 

In June 2020, the Secretary-General of the United Nations launched the UN Comprehensive Response to COVID-19. The United Nations Conference on Trade and Development (UNSC) was criticised for its slow response, especially regarding the UN's global ceasefire, which aimed to open up humanitarian access to conflict zones.

WHO 

The WHO spearheaded initiatives such as the COVID-19 Solidarity Response Fund to raise money for the pandemic response, the UN COVID-19 Supply Chain Task Force, and the solidarity trial for investigating potential treatment options for the disease. The COVAX program, co-led by the WHO, GAVI, and the Coalition for Epidemic Preparedness Innovations (CEPI), aimed to accelerate the development, manufacture, and distribution of COVID-19 vaccines, and to guarantee fair and equitable access across the world.

Protests against governmental measures 

In several countries, protests rose against restrictions such as lockdowns. A February 2021 study found that protests against restrictions were likely to directly increase spread.

Restrictions 

The pandemic shook the world's economy, with especially severe economic damage in the United States, Europe, and Latin America. A consensus report by American intelligence agencies in April 2021 concluded, "Efforts to contain and manage the virus have reinforced nationalist trends globally, as some states turned inward to protect their citizens and sometimes cast blame on marginalized groups." COVID-19 inflamed partisanship and polarisation around the world as bitter arguments exploded over how to respond. International trade was disrupted amid the formation of no-entry enclaves.

Travel restrictions 

The pandemic led many countries and regions to impose quarantines, entry bans, or other restrictions, either for citizens, recent travellers to affected areas, or for all travellers. Travel collapsed worldwide, damaging the travel sector. The effectiveness of travel restrictions was questioned as the virus spread across the world. One study found that travel restrictions only modestly affected the initial spread, unless combined with other infection prevention and control measures. Researchers concluded that "travel restrictions are most useful in the early and late phase of an epidemic" and "restrictions of travel from Wuhan unfortunately came too late". The European Union rejected the idea of suspending the Schengen free travel zone.

Repatriation of foreign citizens 

Several countries repatriated their citizens and diplomatic staff from Wuhan and surroundings, primarily through charter flights. Canada, the United States, Japan, India, Sri Lanka, Australia, France, Argentina, Germany, and Thailand were among the first to do so. Brazil and New Zealand evacuated their own nationals and others. On 14 March, South Africa repatriated 112 South Africans who tested negative, while four who showed symptoms were left behind. Pakistan declined to evacuate its citizens.

On 15 February, the US announced it would evacuate Americans aboard the Diamond Princess cruise ship, and on 21 February, Canada evacuated 129 Canadians from the ship. In early March, the Indian government began repatriating its citizens from Iran. On 20 March, the United States began to withdraw some troops from Iraq.

Impact

Economics 

The pandemic and responses to it damaged the global economy. On 27 February 2020, worries about the outbreak crushed US stock indexes, which posted their sharpest falls since 2008.

Tourism collapsed due to travel restrictions, closing of public places including travel attractions, and advice of governments against travel. Airlines cancelled flights, while British regional airline Flybe collapsed. The cruise line industry was hard hit, and train stations and ferry ports closed. International mail stopped or was delayed.

The retail sector faced reductions in store hours or closures. Retailers in Europe and Latin America faced traffic declines of 40 per cent. North America and Middle East retailers saw a 50–60 per cent drop. Shopping centres faced a 33–43 per cent drop in foot traffic in March compared to February. Mall operators around the world coped by increasing sanitation, installing thermal scanners to check the temperature of shoppers, and cancelling events.

Hundreds of millions of jobs were lost. including more than 40 million Americans. According to a report by Yelp, about 60% of US businesses that closed will stay shut permanently. The International Labour Organization (ILO) reported that the income generated in the first nine months of 2020 from work across the world dropped by 10.7 per cent, or $3.5 trillion.

Supply shortages 

The outbreak was blamed for panic buying, emptying groceries of essentials such as food, toilet paper, and bottled water. Panic buying stemmed from perceived threat, perceived scarcity, fear of the unknown, coping behaviour and social psychological factors (e.g. social influence and trust).

Supply shortages were due to disruption to factory and logistic operations; shortages were worsened by supply chain disruptions from factory and port shutdowns, and labour shortages.

Shortages continued as managers underestimated the speed of economic recovery after the initial economic crash. The technology industry, in particular, warned of delays from underestimates of semiconductor demand for vehicles and other products.

According to WHO's Adhanom, demand for personal protective equipment (PPE) rose one hundredfold, pushing prices up twentyfold. PPE stocks were exhausted everywhere.

In September 2021, the World Bank reported that food prices remain generally stable and the supply outlook remains positive. However, the poorest countries witnessed a sharp increase in food prices, reaching the highest level since the pandemic began. The Agricultural Commodity Price Index stabilized in the third quarter but remained 17% higher than in January 2021.

By contrast, petroleum products were in surplus at the beginning of the pandemic, as demand for gasoline and other products collapsed due to reduced commuting and other trips. The 2021 global energy crisis was driven by a global surge in demand as the world economy recovered. Energy demand was particularly strong in Asia.

Culture 

The performing arts and cultural heritage sectors have been profoundly affected by the pandemic, impacting organisations' operations as well as individualsboth employed and independentglobally. By March 2020, across the world and to varying degrees, museums, libraries, performance venues, and other cultural institutions had been indefinitely closed with their exhibitions, events and performances cancelled or postponed. A UNESCO report estimated ten million job losses worldwide in the culture and creative industries. Some services continued through digital platforms, such as live streaming concerts or web-based arts festivals.

Politics 

The pandemic affected political systems, causing suspensions of legislative activities, isolations or deaths of politicians, and rescheduled elections. Although they developed broad support among epidemiologists, NPIs (non-pharmaceutical interventions) were controversial in many countries. Intellectual opposition came primarily from other fields, along with heterodox epidemiologists.

On 23 March 2020, United Nations Secretary-General António Manuel de Oliveira Guterres appealed for a global ceasefire; 172 UN member states and observers signed a non-binding supporting statement in June, and the UN Security Council passed a resolution supporting it in July.

China 

Multiple provincial-level administrators of the Chinese Communist Party were dismissed over their handling of quarantine measures. Some commentators claimed this move was intended to protect CCP general secretary Xi Jinping. The US intelligence community claimed that China intentionally under-reported its COVID-19 caseload. The Chinese government maintained that it acted swiftly and transparently. Journalists and activists in China who reported on the pandemic were detained by authorities, including Zhang Zhan, who was arrested and tortured.

Italy 

In early March 2020, the Italian government criticised the EU's lack of solidarity with Italy. On 22 March 2020, after a phone call with Italian Prime Minister Giuseppe Conte, Russian president Vladimir Putin ordered the Russian army to send military medics, disinfection vehicles, and other medical equipment to Italy. In early April, Norway and EU states like Romania and Austria started to offer help by sending medical personnel and disinfectant, and Ursula von der Leyen offered an official apology to the country.

United States 

Beginning in mid-April 2020, protestors objected to government-imposed business closures and restricted personal movement and association. Simultaneously, essential workers protested in the form of a brief general strike.  Some political analysts claimed that the pandemic contributed to President Donald Trump's 2020 defeat.

The outbreak prompted calls for the United States to adopt social policies common in other wealthy countries, including universal health care, universal child care, paid sick leave, and higher levels of funding for public health. The Kaiser Family Foundation estimated the cost of preventable hospitalizations (of unvaccinated people) for COVID-19 in the United States between June and November 2021 at US$13.8 billion.

There were also protest in regards to vaccine mandates in the United States. One matter that was taken before the Supreme court which had to do with enforcing said mandates on private companies, resulted in OSHA losing the case.

Other countries 
The number of journalists imprisoned or detained increased worldwide, with some related to the pandemic. The planned NATO "Defender 2020" military exercise in Germany, Poland, and the Baltic states, the largest NATO war exercise since the end of the Cold War, was held on a reduced scale.

The Iranian government was heavily affected by the virus, which infected some two dozen parliament members and political figures. Iran President Hassan Rouhani wrote a public letter to world leaders asking for help on 14 March 2020, due to a lack of access to international markets. Saudi Arabia, which launched a military intervention in Yemen in March 2015, declared a ceasefire.

Diplomatic relations between Japan and South Korea worsened. South Korea criticised Japan's "ambiguous and passive quarantine efforts" after Japan announced travellers from South Korea must quarantine for two weeks. South Korean society was initially polarised on President Moon Jae-in's response to the crisis; many Koreans signed petitions calling for Moon's impeachment or praising his response.

Some countries passed emergency legislation. Some commentators expressed concern that it could allow governments to strengthen their grip on power. In the Philippines, lawmakers granted President Rodrigo Duterte temporary emergency powers. In Hungary, the parliament voted to allow prime minister Viktor Orbán to rule by decree indefinitely, suspend parliament and elections, and punish those deemed to have spread false information. In countries such as Egypt, Turkey, and Thailand, opposition activists and government critics were arrested for allegedly spreading fake news. In India, journalists criticising the government's response were arrested or issued warnings by police and authorities.

Food systems 

The pandemic disrupted food systems worldwide, hitting at a time when hunger and undernourishment were rising (an estimated 690 million people lacked food security in 2019). Food access fell – driven by falling incomes, lost remittances, and disruptions to food production. In some cases, food prices rose. The pandemic and its accompanying lockdowns and travel restrictions slowed movement of food aid. Per the World Health Organization, 811 million individuals were undernourished in 2020, "likely related to the fallout of COVID-19".

Education 

The pandemic impacted educational systems in many countries. Many governments temporarily closed educational institutions, often replaced by online education. Other countries, such as Sweden, kept their schools open. As of September 2020, approximately 1.077 billion learners were affected due to school closures. School closures impacted students, teachers, and families with far-reaching economic and societal consequences. They shed light on social and economic issues, including student debt, digital learning, food insecurity, and homelessness, as well as access to childcare, health care, housing, internet, and disability services. The impact was more severe for disadvantaged children. The Higher Education Policy Institute reported that around 63% of students claimed worsened mental health as a result of the pandemic.

Health 

The pandemic impacted global health for many other conditions. Hospital visits fell. Visits for heart attack symptoms declined by 38% in the US and 40% in Spain. The head of cardiology at the University of Arizona said, "My worry is some of these people are dying at home because they're too scared to go to the hospital." People with strokes and appendicitis were less likely to seek treatment. Medical supply shortages impacted many people. The pandemic impacted mental health, increasing anxiety, depression, and post-traumatic stress disorder, affecting healthcare workers, patients and quarantined individuals.

In late 2022, during the first Northern Hemisphere autumn and winter seasons following the widespread relaxation of global public health measures, North America and Europe experienced a surge in respiratory viruses and coinfections in both adults and children. This formed the beginnings of the 2022–2023 pediatric care crisis and what some experts have termed a "tripledemic" of seasonal influenza, Respiratory Syncytial Virus (RSV), and SARS-CoV-2 throughout North America. In the United Kingdom, pediatric infections also began to spike beyond pre-pandemic levels, albeit with different illnesses, such as Group A streptococcal infection and resultant scarlet fever. As of mid-December 2022, 19 children in the UK had died due to Strep A and the wave of infections had begun to spread into North America and Mainland Europe.

Environment 

The pandemic and the reaction to it positively affected the environment and climate as a result of reduced human activity. During the "anthropause", fossil fuel use decreased, resource consumption declined, and waste disposal improved, generating less pollution. Planned air travel and vehicle transportation declined. In China, lockdowns and other measures resulted in a 26% decrease in coal consumption, and a 50% reduction in nitrogen oxides emissions.

A wide variety of largely mammalian species, both captive and wild, have been shown to be susceptible to SARS-CoV-2, with some encountering particularly fatal outcomes. In particular, both farmed and wild mink have developed symptomatic COVID-19 infections, leading to a 35–55% mortality rate in one study. Other animals, such as white-tailed deer, have not exhibited as high mortality numbers but have effectively become natural reservoirs of the virus, with large numbers of free-ranging deer infected throughout the US and Canada, including approximately 80% of Iowa's wild deer herd.

Discrimination and prejudice 

Heightened prejudice, xenophobia, and racism toward people of Chinese and East Asian descent were documented around the world. Reports from February 2020 (when most confirmed cases were confined to China) cited racist sentiments about Chinese people 'deserving' the virus. Chinese people and other Asian peoples in the United Kingdom and United States reported increasing levels of abuse and assaults. Former US President Trump was criticised for referring to SARS-CoV-2 as the "Chinese Virus" and "Kung Flu", which others condemned as racist and xenophobic.

Age-based discrimination against older adults increased. This was attributed to their perceived vulnerability and subsequent physical and social isolation measures, which, coupled with their reduced social activity, increased dependency on others. Similarly, limited digital literacy left the elderly more vulnerable to isolation, depression, and loneliness.

Correspondence published in The Lancet on 20 November 2021, suggested the "inappropriate stigmatisation of unvaccinated people, who include our patients, colleagues, and other fellow citizens", noting vaccinated individuals' high rates of infection, high viral loads, and therefore their relevant role in transmission.

In January 2022, Amnesty International urged Italy to change their anti-COVID-19 restrictions to avoid discrimination against unvaccinated people, saying that "the government must continue to ensure that the entire population can enjoy its fundamental rights."  The restrictions included mandatory vaccination over the age of 50, and mandatory vaccination to use public transport.

Lifestyle changes 

The pandemic triggered massive changes in behaviour, from increased Internet commerce to cultural changes in the job market. Online retailers in the US posted US$791.70 billion in sales in 2020, an increase of 32.4% from $598.02 billion from the year before. Home delivery orders increased, while indoor restaurant dining shut down due to lockdown orders or low sales. Hackers, cybercriminals, and scammers took advantage of the changes to launch new attacks. Education in some countries temporarily shifted from physical attendance to video conferencing. Massive layoffs shrank the airline, travel, hospitality, and other industries. Despite most corporations implementing measures to address COVID-19 in the workplace, a poll from Catalyst found that as many as 68% of employees around the world felt that these policies were only performative and "not genuine".

Historiography 
A 2021 study noted that the COVID-19 pandemic had increased interest in epidemics and infectious diseases among both historians and the general public. Prior to the pandemic, these topics were usually overlooked by "general" history and only received attention in the history of medicine.

Religion

According to the Pew Research Center, amid the COVID-19 pandemic some religious groups defied public health measures and stated "the rules [during COVID-19] were a violation of religious freedom".

Information dissemination 

Some news organizations removed their online paywalls for some or all of their pandemic-related articles and posts. Some scientific publishers made pandemic-related papers available with open access. The share of papers published on preprint servers prior to peer review increased dramatically. Research is indexed and searchable in the NIH COVID-19 Portfolio.

Misinformation 

Misinformation and conspiracy theories about the pandemic are widespread. They travelled through mass media, social media, and text messaging. WHO declared an "infodemic" of incorrect information. Cognitive biases, such as jumping to conclusions and confirmation bias, were linked to conspiracy beliefs, including COVID-19 vaccine hesitancy.

Transition to endemic phase 

In June 2022, an article in Human Genomics said that the pandemic was still "raging", but that "now is the time to explore the transition from the pandemic to the endemic phase. The latter will require worldwide vigilance and cooperation, especially in emerging countries", and suggested that developed countries should assist in boosting vaccination rates worldwide.

As of 4 November 2022, health officials in some countries have said that COVID-19 is endemic or that the country was beginning to transition to an endemic phase. These include Cambodia, Indonesia, Lebanon, Malaysia, Mexico, Philippines, Singapore, South Korea, Spain and Vietnam.

On 3 December 2022, Tedros Adhanom Ghebreyesus, WHO Director-General indicated, "We are much closer to being able to say that the emergency phase of the pandemic is over".

Culture and society

The pandemic has been included in the narratives of ongoing pre-pandemic TV shows and made a focus in new ones, with mixed results. Writing about the then-upcoming BBC sitcom Pandemonium on 16 December 2020, The New York Times asked, "Are we ready to laugh about Covid-19? Or rather, is there anything amusing, or recognizable in a humorous way, about life during a plague, with all of its indignities and setbacks, not to mention its rituals and rules."

In films and television:
 South Park: Post Covid, a 2021 animated comedy film depicting the main characters of South Park forty years after the COVID-19 pandemic broke out.
 Songbird, 2020 science-fiction thriller film inspired by the COVID-19 pandemic, with an exaggerated twist of COVID-19 mutating into COVID-23 in 2024.
 The sixth season of Queen Sugar, a 2016 drama series focusing on a pair of siblings who are forced to cope with their new life of taking over the sugarcane farm after a loved one's death; in this season, the story is predominantly about the COVID-19 pandemic and some of the characters catching the virus, such as Charley.
 Social Distance, a 2020 television series focusing on individuals who are forced to cope with the COVID-19 pandemic, the effects of quarantine, and the subsequent George Floyd protests.

See also 
 Emerging infectious disease
 Globalization and disease
 List of epidemics
 Coronavirus diseases

Notes

References

Further reading

External links

Health agencies 

 COVID-19 (Questions & Answers, instructional videos; Facts/MythBusters) by the World Health Organization (WHO)
 COVID-19 by the Government of Canada
 COVID-19 (Q&A) by the European Centre for Disease Prevention and Control
 COVID-19 (Q&A) by the Ministry of Health, Singapore
 COVID-19 (Q&A) by the US Centers for Disease Control and Prevention (CDC)
 COVID-19 Information for the Workplace by the US National Institute for Occupational Safety and Health (NIOSH)

Data and graphs 
 Coronavirus disease (COVID-19) situation reports and map by the World Health Organization (WHO)
 COVID-19 Resource Center, map, and historical data by Johns Hopkins University
 COVID-19 data sets published by the European Centre for Disease Prevention and Control (ECDC)
 COVID-19 Observer based on Johns Hopkins University data
 COVID-19 Statistics and Research published by Our World in Data
 COVID-19 Tracker from Stat News
 COVID-19 Projections for many countries published by Institute for Health Metrics and Evaluation

Medical journals 

 Coronavirus (COVID-19) by The New England Journal of Medicine
 Coronavirus (COVID-19) Hub by BMJ Publishing Group
 Coronavirus Disease 2019 (COVID-19) by JAMA: The Journal of the American Medical Association
 COVID-19: Novel Coronavirus Outbreak  by Wiley Publishing
 COVID-19 pandemic (2019–20) Collection by Public Library of Science (PLOS)
 COVID-19 Portfolio, a curated collection of publications and preprints by National Institutes of Health (NIH)
 COVID-19 Research Highlights by Springer Nature
 COVID-19 Resource Centre by The Lancet
 Novel Coronavirus Information Center by Elsevier

 
2019 disease outbreaks
2020 disease outbreaks
2021 disease outbreaks
2022 disease outbreaks
2023 disease outbreaks
2020s economic history
21st-century epidemics
21st century in health
2019 disasters in China
2019 in international relations
2020 in international relations
2021 in international relations
2022 in international relations
2023 in international relations
December 2019 events in China
January 2020 events in China
February 2020 events in China
March 2020 events in China
Articles containing video clips
Atypical pneumonias
Health disasters in China
History of Wuhan
Occupational safety and health
Pandemics
Public health emergencies of international concern